This is a list of the Headmasters and masters of Derby School, England.

List of Headmasters
ante 1159 Willielmus Barbae Aprilis
1261–1275 Magister Nicholas
1275–12nn William Goodman 
12nn–1291/92 Robert Ingram
1291/92–? Magister Domus Scte Helene
1348–? Sir Peter Carre 
1406–? Rev. Stephan Belle
1527–? Rev. Henry Brytlebank 
159n–1610 Rev. Richard Johnson
1610–1627 Rev. Gervase Hall
1627–164n Mr. Raynor
164n–1652 Rev. John Bingham
1652–165n Richard Brandreth
165n–1664/7 Rev. Hill 
1664/1667–1668 Rev. William Osborne
1668–167n Robert Stone
167n–168n Rev. John Mathews 
168n–1684 Rev. Jasper Horsington
1684–1697 Rev. Thomas Cantrell MA (1649–1698)
1697–1772 Rev. Anthony Blackwall MA (Cantab.) (1672–1730)
1722–c1750 Rev. Josua Winter
c1750–1761 Rev. George Almond
1761–1774 Rev. Thomas Manlove MA (Cantab.) (1729–1 February 1802)
1774–1793 Rev. Anthony Clarkson or Clarkstone MA (Cantab.) (1748–1819)
1795–1834 Rev. James Bligh (16 May 1760 – 18 August 1834), cousin of William Bligh of the Bounty
1834–1843 Dr William Fletcher
1843–1858 John Hudson
1858–1865 Rev. Dr Thomas Humphreys Leary
1865–1889 Rev. Walter Clark BD (1838–April 12, 1889)
1889–1896 James R. Sterndale Bennett MA (Cantab) (1847–1928)
1898–1906 Percy Kitto Tollit MA (Oxon.)
1906–1909 Rev. A. Ernest Crawley (11 July 1867 or 1869–21 October 1924)
1909–1931 Rev. Angus Clifton Knight MA (Oxon.) (1873–16 April 1931)
1931–1942 Thomas John Pinches York MA (Cantab.) (1 August 1898 – 25 May 1970) (previously at Bedford School, later Headmaster of the Merchant Taylors' School, Crosby, 1942–1964, and President of the Headmasters' Association, 1950)
1942–1961 Leslie Bradley MA (Oxon.) (1902–2004), previously a Maths master at King Edward VII School, Sheffield
1961–1979 Norman Elliott MA (Oxon.) (died 2012), Maths
1979–1989 Brian Seager Bachelor of Science B.Sc. (Nottingham) (Nottm.)

Notable masters

First St Helen's House period, 1863-1939
 Falkner John Meade, novelist and poet
 Hewitt H. Marmaduke (assistant Classical Master, 1867 to 1870), author of A Manual of Our Mother Tongue
 Hose Rev. Henry Judge (Maths master, 1867–1874), mathematician
Lowndes Jefferson, rower who won the Diamond Challenge Sculls at Henley Royal Regatta five times and the single scull triple crown twice
 Laffan Rev. Robert de Courcy (Senior Classical Master, 1880–1884), principal of Cheltenham College, member of the International Olympic Committee
 Tacchella Benjamin (Senior Master 1887–1913), author of The Derby School Register 1570-1901, published in 1902
 Philpot Octavius Clerk, in Holy Orders 1891, Assistant Master
 Prinach Chas.W.M. 1891, Assistant Master
 Carnegie Chas. E. 1891, Assistant Master
 Gibson Claude William (1886-1962) English and French 1914-1942
 Gately Vincent Humphrey, House Master of Gatelys
 Fuller Leslie John, House Master of Fullers
 Tanner Arthur Spencer Gosset-Tanner, House Master of Tanners

Overton Hall and Amber Valley period in World War II 1939-1945
Masters included:

Second St. Helen's House period after World War II 1945 - 1966 and at Moorway Lane at Littleover 1966 - 1989
Masters in the last years at St Helen's House (1945–1966) and at Moorway Lane Littleover (1966–1989) included:

 
 Allitt Sidney Eric 'Rocky' BSc (Head Physics Dept and bassoon player) (1956-1981)
 Arnott 'Snotty' (English, English Literature and drama)
 Aspinall 'Rasper' (French)
 Atkinson C. Daly (Music Teacher, and pipe organ builder)
 Atkinson John Jennings, (Latin and Commander of OTC and JTC)
 Barwell 'Jed' BA (French, German)
 Bell 'Ding-dong' D.R. BSc (Maths)
 Bishop W.A. 'Billy' (Chemistry)
 Bloomer Billy (Maths)
 Bostock Russ (Sports)
 Bowker Martin (German / French)
 Bradley 'Les' (Headmaster 1942–1960)
 Brewer Viv (Music)
 Brearley D. MA (Head Geography Dept)
 Burns 'Pop' (Maths and chess)
 Butler W.O. 'Wob' BA (Geography, Deputy Headmaster from 1960)
 Clarke 'Nobby' (English)
 Coates 'Percy' (Chemistry)
 Coe Mick (Coe 90) (Maths)
 Collier-James A. (Art)
 Coupe Graham (PE & Geography)
 Curtis Samuel John (Lt.2 i/c JTC)
 D'Arcy Mrs Joan (History, also Violin player)
 Davies G.H. (Latin)
 Dickenson D.J. (Physical Education)
 Eldred 'Derdle' R.B. BA (English)
 Elliott Norman 'Sweat' or "Bog" MA (Maths, Headmaster 1961–1979)
 ‘’’ Espinosa’’’ Valerie (Head of Physics 1981- )
 Fisher John 'Running'
 Foulke Michael G. 'Mike' BSc (Chemistry, Flight Lt. last CO of CCF in 1973)
 Fox Mike (Modern Languages)
 Geddy Bill (Woodwork)
 Gibbons Miss (? subject)
 Gillard MBE Ernest William, 'Lardy' (Maths, Capt. of JTC 1928–1945,Deputy headmaster until 1961)
 Glister W.E. (Maths)
 Greenslade C.P. 'Thunderguts' MA (Modern Languages)
 Grime Rev. Allan Godfrey, (RE, English and Commander of CCF and JTC) House Master
 Guy 'Pontius' or 'Pont' BA (Head Latin Dept)
 Hastings 'Pris' (Physics)
 Hayer Gian (Chemistry)
 Hodgkinson Harry MA (Chemistry and Religious Instruction)
 Humphrey Mark (Art)
 Irving Stella Mrs S.L. BA (Modern Languages)
 Kelsey Ken (Physics)
 Kimber 'Wal' (Junior Modern Languages)
 Kirton W Frank MA (Head of English Dept)
 Lane 'Bronco' (Chemistry) (1960–1965)
 Lawson Martin (Latin & English)
 Levy 'Sol' (Modern languages)
 Lomas Brian (Physics)
 Lowes Mrs J. BSc (Mathematics)
 Marlowe Edna (French, German)
 McElroy Mark BSc(Head of Chemistry 1968–1981) (Head of Science 1981–1989)
 Melling C. 'Alf' (Chemistry)
 Millington Guy 'Spike' (Head of Biology)
 Mitchell Brian? (Geography)
 Mollison D.W. BSc (Head Biology Dept)
 Molson (Biology)
 Nazeer Mrs C. (Modern Languages)
 Newbold 'Dave' or 'Neddy' MA (Music)*
 NewtonJohn 'Isaac' ATD (Art)
 Payne (English Lit)
 Pettigrew MBE Robert Gavin (Sports and CO of CCF)
 Pickering Geof (English & Latin)
 Plank 'Josh' (RE)
 Rainbow Tony (Metalwork)
 Rayburn 'Barney' or 'Boris' MA (Head Modern Languages Dept)
 Reeson Edward Francis,'Curly' (English, CO of JTC and CCF, Rowing)
 Rhodes 'Alf' (Fizzer) BSc (Maths, Physics and RE)(1950–1965)
 Richards Jack BA (Head History Dept)
 Robson G.R. BA (English and French)
 Roebuck Dr. P.J. (Head Chemistry Dept - 1968)
 Rudge Geofrey Allen BSc (Maths and Economics and Lt CCF)
 Ryder Anthony Michael, 'Tony' (Chemistry and Physics and Lt CCF)
 Said Selim 'Sammy' (PE)
 Scott John Robert (Maths and 2Lt CCF)
 Steggals John (Maths)
 Summerbell William,'Loopy' BA (History and Latin, Lt 2i/c JTC and CCF)
 Tamblin Douglas Victor,  (Geography and PE, Capt CO of CCF)
 Towers Philip James, 'Lofty' (Chemistry and Fl Lt. CO of CCF)
 Waghorne Ken (German)
 Walker 'Crispy'or 'Pongo' (Maths)
 WilkinsonPaul (geography, football 'Bands')
 Whitehall Tony BSc (Head Maths Dept and pipe organ builder)
 Wood Eric Joseph 'Loggy' or 'Timber' or 'Splinter' (Head PE Dept, CO CCF)
 Woods Alfie (Physics)
 Yeomans 'Sid' (Gen Science, Woodwork and Sex Education!)

References
Notes

Sources
Distinguished Alumni of Derby School by J. M. J. Fletcher (Derby Reporter, 1872)
Derby School: a Short History, published for a quarter centenary in 1954 jointly by George Percy Gollin and Roy Christian (Derbyshire Advertiser)
A History of Derby School to the End of the 19th Century, published 1953 by Colin Bell
A History of Derby School Cadet Corps 1862 to 1973, second revised and Enlarged edition 2016, by Andrew Polkey

See also
Derby School
List of notable Old Derbeians
:Category:People educated at Derby School

Derby School masters
Derby School masters
 
Derby School
Derby School